Donald Clement Klosterman  (January 18, 1930 – June 7, 2000) was one of professional football's most accomplished executives, building teams in three different leagues after a serious accident ended his playing career as a quarterback and left his legs partially paralyzed.  In the 1960s, Klosterman helped the American Football League (AFL, 1960–1969) overtake the NFL during the bidding wars that led the older league to seek a merger with the AFL.  In the 1970s, he was a successful general manager for the NFL's Baltimore Colts and Los Angeles Rams, and in the 1980s he signed all-American quarterback Steve Young to a stunning contract for the Los Angeles Express in the United States Football League (USFL).

Early life and playing career
Klosterman was a German American born in Le Mars, Iowa, the 12th of 15 children.  As a youth, he moved to Compton, California with his family.  He was collegiate football's leading passer in 1951, for Loyola University of Los Angeles, now Loyola Marymount University. Drafted by the Cleveland Browns, Klosterman found himself behind Otto Graham and was traded to the Los Angeles Rams, only to back up Norm Van Brocklin and Bob Waterfield.  He turned to the Canadian football, playing quarterback for the Calgary Stampeders until he had a skiing accident.

Klosterman almost lost his life on a ski slope at Banff, Alberta on Saint Patrick's Day in 1957.  He tried to avoid another skier, and damaged his spinal cord when he hit a tree.  He had eight surgeries and was told he would never walk again, but he regained partial feeling and with the aid of a cane and walked again within a year.

Football executive career
In 1960, Frank Leahy, the former head football coach at the University of Notre Dame, was the general manager of the AFL's Los Angeles Chargers.  He asked Klosterman to help him recruit players.   Klosterman joined the team and helped land future Hall of Famers Lance Alworth,along with Ernie Ladd, John Hadl and Jack Kemp. He moved on to the AFL's Dallas Texans, and with them and their successors, the Kansas City Chiefs, he helped sign Bobby Bell, Buck Buchanan, Pete Beathard, Mike Garrett and Otis Taylor, most of them important players in the Chiefs' win over the Minnesota Vikings in the fourth AFL-NFL World Championship Game. 

He guided the AFL's Houston Oilers to two playoff berths in his four years as their general manager (1966–1969), then moved to the NFL as Baltimore's general manager in 1970. The Colts won Super Bowl V after his first season as GM. Carroll Rosenbloom, the Colts' owner, traded franchises with the Los Angeles Rams owner Robert Irsay in 1972. Rosenbloom kept Klosterman as his GM through the 1982 season and was rewarded with a series of playoff teams. 

Klosterman then served as general manager of the Los Angeles Express of the United States Football League (1984-1985), which gained wide publicity when he signed Young, the star passer from BYU.  The deal was in excess of $40 million in 1984.  Although the league folded, Young became a star with the NFL's San Francisco 49ers. 

In 1995, after the Los Angeles Rams went to St. Louis and the Los Angeles Raiders returned to Oakland, Klosterman joined with former 49ers coach, Bill Walsh, in an unsuccessful effort to obtain a new NFL franchise for Los Angeles.  

Klosterman died in Los Angeles of a heart attack on June 7, 2000.

See also
 List of NCAA major college football yearly passing leaders

References

External links
 

1930 births
2000 deaths
American Football League contributors
American football quarterbacks
Baltimore Colts executives
Calgary Stampeders players
Cleveland Browns players
Dallas Texans (AFL) executives
Houston Oilers executives
Kansas City Chiefs executives
Los Angeles Rams executives
Los Angeles Rams players
Los Angeles Chargers executives
Loyola Lions football players
People from Le Mars, Iowa
Players of American football from Compton, California
Compton High School alumni